Jhansi - Gwalior - Etawah Link Express is an intercity train of the Indian Railways connecting Jhansi Junction in Uttar Pradesh and Etawah Junction of Uttar Pradesh. It is currently being operated with 11801/11802 train numbers on a daily basis.

Service

The 11801/Jhansi - Gwalior - Etawah Link Express has an average speed of 41 km/hr and covers 216 km in 5 hrs 15 mins. 11802/Etawah - Gwalior - Jhansi Link Express  has an average speed of 40 km/hr and 216 km in 5 hrs 25 mins.

Route and halts 

The important halts of the train are:

Coach composite

The train has standard ICF rakes with max speed of 110 kmph. The train consists of 8 coaches :

 6 General
 2 Second-class Luggage/parcel van

Notes

External links 

 Jhansi - Gwalior - Etawah Link Express
 Etawah - Gwalior - Jhansi Link Express

References 

Express trains in India
Rail transport in Madhya Pradesh
Trains from Jhansi
Railway services introduced in 2016
Transport in Etawah